Ryan Sweeting was the defending champion, and he won in the final 6–4, 6–2 against Carsten Ball.

Seeds

Draw

Finals

Top half

Bottom half

External links
Main Draw
Qualifying Draw

Challenger of Dallas - Singles
2010 Singles